Alpine skiing at the 2018 Winter Paralympics was held at the Jeongseon Alpine Centre, South Korea. The thirty events occurred from 10 to 18 March 2018.

Events

The competition events are:

Downhill (sitting, standing, visually impaired): women – men
Super-G (sitting, standing, visually impaired): women – men
Giant slalom (sitting, standing, visually impaired): women – men
Slalom (sitting, standing, visually impaired): women – men
Super combined (sitting, standing, visually impaired): women – men

Competition schedule
The following is the competition schedule for all thirty events.

All times are local (UTC+9).

Medal summary

Medal table

Women's events

Men's events

See also
Alpine skiing at the 2018 Winter Olympics
IPC – Official website
Multi-Medallists - Alpine Skiing IPC – Official website

References

External links
 Official Results Book – Alpine Skiing

 
2018 Winter Paralympics
2018 Winter Paralympics events
Paralympics
Alpine skiing competitions in South Korea